Sülümenli is a town in the county of Ulubey, outside of Uşak Turkey.

History
 Founded in 334 BC by the Macedonians the city, close to the  border of Phrygia and Lydia, was military town, that maintained its position in strategic importance throughout Hellenistic Roman and Byzantine. The city's name at this time was Blaundos verified in 1845. W. J. Ulubey by Hamilton by finding an inscription in the ruins of the town  that read "Blaundeo of the Macedonian (Macedonian Blaundus on)" 
The city fell to the Turks in the 12th century.

Geography
Uşak is 45 km, and Ulubey is 15 km from the town, and located north is the village of Gedikler.

Climate
The town is in a region where summers are a hot and dry continental climate, while winters are cold and snowy.

Village population data by year
2007 212
2000 201
1990 202

Economy
The local economy is based on agriculture and livestock production especially cereals and tobacco production.

Infrastructure
The village has a primary school and town drinking water supply but has no  health care services.
There are the ruins of the ancient city of Blaundos at the village.

References

Greek colonies in Anatolia
Ancient Greek archaeological sites in Turkey
Roman sites in Turkey
History of Manisa Province